Middle Branch Moose River starts in Old Forge, New York at the outlet of First Lake and flows into the Moose River in Mckeever, New York.

References 

Rivers of New York (state)
Rivers of Herkimer County, New York